The Hongzhou school was a Chinese school of Chán of the Tang period (618–907), which started with Mazu Daoyi (709–788) and included key figures like Baizhang Huaihai (749–814), Dazhu Huihai (fl. 8th c.), and Huangbo Xiyun (d. 850?). 

The name Hongzhou refers to the Tang dynasty province that was located in the northern part of present-day Jiangxi province (the area around Nanchang). Mazu taught here during his last years and some of his disciples also taught in this region.

During the Song dynasty (960–1279), many texts were written which constructed encounter dialogues that included Hongzhou school masters as the main characters. These texts present them as iconoclastic and antinomian figures. However, modern scholars do not consider these later Song sources as reliable depictions of these historical figures.

History

The An Lu-shan Rebellion (755-763) led to a loss of control by the Tang dynasty, which changed the position of Chan. Metropolitan Chan began to lose its status, while...

Mazu Daoyi
Mazu Daoyi (709–788) was a monk from Sifang county, Sichuan. His teachers are said to have included Reverend Tang (684-734) of Zizhou, Reverend Jin (Korean: Kim, also known as Wuxiang, Korean: Musang), and Huairang. Traditionally, Mazu is depicted as a successor in the lineage of Huineng, through his teacher Nanyue Huairang. McRae argues that the connection between Huineng and Huairang is doubtful, being the product of later rewritings of Chán-history to place Mazu in the traditional lineages. 

In the latter half of his life, Mazu moved to Hongzhou (present day north Jiangxi), were he began taking students. First he resided on Gonggong mountain, and then he settled in Nanchang's state-sponsored Kaiyuan monastery (today known as Youmin Temple) in Hongzhou (present day north Jiangxi). During his two decade period at this monastery, Mazu's fame spread and he attracted many disciples from throughout the empire. 

According to Poceski, "Mazu had the largest number of close disciples (rushi dizi, literally, “disciples who entered the room”) among Chan teachers from the Tang period." Some important students of Mazu include: Nanquan, Fenzhou Wuye (761–823), Guizong Zhichang (dates unknown), Xingshan Weikuan (755–817), Zhangjing Huaihui (756–815), Danxia Tianran (739–824), Dongsi Ruhui (744–823), Tianhuang Daowu (748–807), and Furong Taiyu (747–826).

Poceski also notes that Mazu's disciples "come across as monks at home in their dealings with powerful officials. They appear conversant with Buddhist texts, doctrines, and practices, and proficient at preaching to monks and literati alike."

Xitang Zhizang 
After Mazu's death in 788, Xitang Zhizang became the leader of Kaiyuan monastery. Despite his leading role, little information on him is found in Chan sources and there is no record of his sayings. None of his disciples were influential and perhaps this is why he was neglected in later sources. After the Tang, Baizhang and Nanquan supplanted Xitang as the leaders of the second generation of the school.

Baizhang Huaihai

Baizhang Huaihai (720–814) was a dharma heir of Mazu and a member of the aristocratic Wang clan of Taiyuan. Baizhang later came to be seen as Mazu's most important disciple, though early on, his name did not even appear in Mazu's stele inscription as part of Mazu's ten main disciples. Baizhang's main center was at the remote Baizhang mountain southwest of Shimen where he taught students, including Guishan Lingyou (771–853) and Huangbo, for two decades. 

Later tradition attributes to Bhaizang the creation of a unique kind of Chan monasticism and the authorship of an early set of rules for Chan monastics, the Pure Rules of Baizhang., but there is no historical evidence for this. Indeed, according to Poceski "his traditional image as a patron saint of “Chan monasticism” is not in any meaningful way related to him as a historical person. Baizhang did not institute a novel system of Chan monastic rules that was institutionally disengaged from the mainstream tradition of Tang monasticism." 

Later Song dynasty texts also attempt to make Baizhang the main "orthodox" recipient of Mazu's lineage. This is a later genealogical construct by Song authors, Mazu did not have one single "orthodox" disciple, but many different disciples who spread his teachings throughout China.

Other students of Mazu 
Mazu's many students spread his teachings throughout China. A major center of the Hongzhou tradition was at Mount Lu, where the leading disciple Guizong Zhichang (dates unknown) and Fazang (dates unknown) built the first Chan communities on the famous mountain, like Guizong temple, which was visited by the famous poet Li Bo. Other important disciples who formed communities of their own in Jiangxi include Shigong Huizang (dates unknown), Nanyuan Daoming (dates unknown), and Yangqi Zhenshu (d. 820). 

Huaihui and Weikuan are known for having established the Hongzhou school in the imperial capital of Chang'an. Weikuan was even invited by Emperor Xianzong to preach at the imperial court in 809 and he remained in the capital's Xingshan monastery until the end of his life, becoming a central figure of the imperial capital's religious life. He was also the teacher of the famous poet Bo Juyi.

Regarding the old capital of Luoyang, the best known disciple of Mazu who taught here was Foguang Ruman (752–842?). He was also a teacher of the poet Bo Juyi.  

Outside of Jiangxi, Yaoshan, Ruhui, Tanzang (758–827), Deng Yinfeng (dates unknown), and Zhaoti Huilang (738–820) all formed communities in Hunan, while Yanguan, Dazhu, and Damei Fachang formed communities in Zhejiang. Regarding the northern provinces, Shaanxi and Shanxi received disciples such as Wuye, Zhixian, and Magu Baoche (dates unknown).

As Poceski writes, the Hongzhou school heavily relied on imperial and aristocratic patronage which allowed it to quickly emerge as a major Chan tradition in the ninth century.

Relationship with other traditions 

There are also links between Mazu's school and the Oxhead school. Some of Mazu's students were known to have come from the Oxhead school and others were sent to study at Oxhead monasteries by Mazu himself. An inscription for Dayi, one of Mazu's students, condemns sectarianism and according to Poceski "rejects the sharp distinctions between the Northern and Southern schools propounded by Shenhui and his followers and instead argues for a rapprochement between the two." Poceski also notes that "the inscription implies that Mazu's disciples adopted a tolerant attitude toward other Chan schools/lineages and eschewed the pursuit of narrow sectarian agendas (or at least were more subtle about it)."

During the mid-Tang, most other major Chan schools (the Northern school, the Oxhead school, Shenhui's Southern school and the Baotang) all died out, being unable to attract enough students and support. This allowed Mazu's school to become the dominant Chan tradition in China. The only other school which survived this period was Shitou's school, though it remained a marginal one. 

The Hongzhou school superseded the older Chan schools and established themselves as their official successor, the inclusive defender of Tang Chan orthodoxy which avoided the antinomianism of Baotang and the sectarianism of Shenhui's Southern school. While individual teachers like Shitou Xiqian and Guifeng Zongmi did present alternative traditions, they never rivaled the Hongzhou tradition, which remained the normative form of Chan for the rest of the Tang and beyond.

Mazu's students were also influential during the spread of Chan to Korea during the pivotal period of the first half of the ninth century. During this period, almost all Korean Seon monks who participated in the transmission of Chan to Korea were students of Mazu's disciples. These figures founded seven out of the Korean “nine mountain schools of Sŏn” (kusan sŏnmun).

Later developments and figures 

By the latter Tang dynasty, the Hongzhou school's was supplanted by various distinct regional traditions (the "five houses") that arose during the instability of the late Tang and the Five Dynasties eras. The first of these was the Guiyang school of Guishan and his disciple Yangshan, but this tradition did not survive the fall of the Tang.

A key figure of the third generation is Huangbo Xiyun (died 850), who was a dharma heir of Baizhang Huaihai. He started his monastic career at Mount Huangbo. In 842 he took up residence at Lung-hsing Monastery at the invitation of Pei Xiu (787 or 797–860), who was also a lay-student of Guifeng Zongmi of Shenhui's Heze school. Huangbo's student, Linji Yìxuán (died 866 CE), was later seen as the founder of his own school, the Linji school, based in Hebei's Linji temple, which remains an important tradition today after having become the dominant form of Chan during the Song dynasty.

As Poceski writes, With the passage of time, some of the luster of Mazu's religious personality was transferred to Linji, and the image of the Hongzhou school was altered in ways that reflected the ideological stances of subsequent Chan/Zen traditions. This process is reflected in later mythologized constructions of the Hongzhou school's teachings and character. The mystique ascribed to Mazu and his disciples was accompanied with assorted obscurations of the Hongzhou school's history, doctrines, practices, and institutions.

Teachings
According to Jinhua Jia, "the doctrinal foundation of the Hongzhou school was mainly a mixture of the tathagata-garbha thought and prajñaparamita theory, with a salient emphasis on the kataphasis of the former." 

Poceski also highlights the importance of buddha-nature for the Hongzhou school, though he also writes that "overall there is a disposition to avoid imputing explicit ontological status to the Buddha-nature...this is accompanied by a Madhyamaka-like stress on nonattachment and elimination of one-sided views—especially evident in Baizhang's record—that are based on the notion that ultimate reality cannot be predicated." He also argues that the Hongzhou school's doctrinal approach was an eclectic approach that drew on diverse sources, including Madhyamaka and Yogacara, along with Daoist works. Furthermore, their use of sources was "accompanied by an aversion to dogmatic assertions of indelible truths and an awareness of the provisional nature of conceptual constructs." Thus, while the Hongzhou school made use of various teachings, they were not to be seen as a fixed theory, since ultimate truth is indescribable and beyond words.

Monasticism 
The Hongzhou school was a monastic tradition and as such, buddhist monasticism, with its Vinaya disciplinary code and emphasis on renunciation and simple living, is an assumed background to Hongzhou school sources. The Guishan jingce (Guishan's Admonitions) provides an overview of the Hongzhou school's teachings on monastic life and ethics, which are generally follow traditional Chinese models.

Non-attachment 
According to Poceski, at the core of the  teaching of Hongzhou teachers like Mazu, Dazhu, Baizhang, Nanquan, and Huangbo is the cultivation of nonattachment, "an ascent into increasingly rarefied states of detachment and transcendence, in which the vestiges of dualistic thought are eliminated. This implies not clinging to any doctrine, practice, or experience, including the notions of detachment and nonduality. The perfection of a liberated state of mind that is free from attachment and ignorance, explains Baizhang, is predicated on the realization of the twofold emptiness of person and things."

Awakening is the sudden letting go of all deluded thoughts, it is a mind that does not abide or cling to anything. Dhazu defines the non-abiding mind (wuzhu xin) as follows:Not abiding anywhere [means that] one does not abide in good and evil, existence and nothingness, inside, outside, or in-between. Not abiding in emptiness and not abiding in non-emptiness, not abiding in concentration and not abiding in the absence of concentration, that is not abiding anywhere. Only this not abiding anywhere is the [true] abode. When one attains this, it is called the non-abiding mind. The non-abiding mind is the Buddha mind.

"This Mind is Buddha" 
Two related teachings which appear frequently in the works of Mazu and his disciplines are the statements "This Mind is Buddha" (jixin shi fo) and "Ordinary Mind is the Way." This idea is based on Mahayana teachings on buddha-nature, as well on the doctrine of the non-duality of samsara and nirvana and Chinese Buddhist ideas, like the doctrine of the "true mind" (zhenxin) and the teachings of the Awakening of Faith.

The basic idea is that there is a true buddha mind within all sentient beings, but this can be obscured by passing defilements. As Mazu states:The mind can be spoken of [in terms of its two aspects]: birth and death, and suchness. The mind as suchness is like a clear mirror, which can reflect images. The mirror symbolizes the mind; the images symbolize phenomena (dharmas). If the mind attaches to phenomena, then it gets involved in external causes and conditions, which is the meaning of birth and death. If the mind does not attach to phenomena, that is the meaning of suchness.  

One source text of Mazu's teaching states:  All of you should believe that your mind is Buddha, that this mind is identical with Buddha. The Great Master Bodhidharma came from India to China and transmitted the One Mind teaching of Mahāyāna so that it can lead you all to awakening. Fearing that you will be too confused and will not believe that this One Mind is inherent in all of you, he used the Laṅkāvatāra Scripture to seal the sentient beings' mind-ground. Therefore, in the Laṅkāvatāra Scripture, the Buddha stated that mind is the essential teaching, and the gate of nonbeing is the Dharma-gate. This indicates that Mazu's teaching drew from the Laṅkāvatāra sutra's mind only teaching (yogacara - cittamatra). Other teachings of Mazu and Baizhang also quote or paraphrase other Mahayana sutras, like the Vimalakirti sutra and Prajñāpāramitā scriptures. According to Poceski, "rather than repudiating the scriptures or rejecting their authority, the records of Mazu and his disciples are full of quotations and allusions to a range of canonical texts." Poceski also notes that in Baizhang's record one can find numerous scriptural citations, including "obscure references and the use of a technical vocabulary that point to a mastery of canonical texts and doctrines." However, even while they retained the use of scripture and demonstrated a mastery of the canon, the Hongzhou sources also demonstrate that these Chan teachers had the ability to express the insights of Mahayana in a new way.

"Ordinary Mind is the Way" 
Another teaching by Mazu states: If you want to know the Way directly, then ordinary mind is the Way. What is an ordinary mind? It means no intentional creation and action, no right or wrong, no grasping or rejecting, no terminable or permanent, no profane or holy. The sutra says, “Neither the practice of ordinary men, nor the practice of sages—that is the practice of the Bodhisattva.” Now all these are just the Way: walking, abiding, sitting, lying, responding to situations, and dealing with things.Mazu also taught:“Self-nature is originally perfectly complete. If only one is not hindered by either good or evil things, he is called a man who cultivates the Way. Grasping good and rejecting evil, contemplating emptiness and entering concentration—all these belong to intentional action. If one seeks further outside, he strays farther away.”As noted by Jinhua Jia, this doctrine was attacked by various Chan figures, such as by Zongmi who stated that "they fail to distinguish between ignorance and enlightenment, the inverted and the upright," and Nanyang Huizhong, who argued: “the south[ern doctrine] wrongly taught deluded mind as true mind, taking thief as son, and regarding mundane wisdom as Buddha wisdom.” According to Zogmi, Hongzhou Chan's mistake was rooted in its teaching that greed, hatred and delusion, good and evil, happiness or suffering are all buddha-nature.

"Original purity" and "No cultivation" 
Mazu also stated that the Buddha-nature or the Original Mind is already pure, without the need for cultivation and hence he stated that “the Way needs no cultivation”. This was because according to Mazu:This mind originally existed and exists at present, without depending on intentional creation and action; it was originally pure and is pure at present, without waiting for cleaning and wiping. Self-nature attains nirvana; self-nature is pure; self-nature is liberation; and self nature departs [from delusions].This view was also criticized by Zongmi because he believed it “betrayed the gate of gradual cultivation.”

For Mazu, Buddha nature was actualized in everyday human life and its actions. As noted by Jinhua Jia "The ultimate realm of enlightenment manifests itself everywhere in human life, and Buddha-nature functions in every aspect of daily experiences". Thus, Mazu argued:

Meditation 
Hongzhou school sources don't contain much sustained discussion on the topic of meditation. Some sources contain explicit criticisms of certain forms of meditative practice (but most of these appear in later unreliable sources). One passage by Mazu states:If one comprehends the mind and objects, then false thinking is not created again. When there is no more false thinking, that is acceptance of the non-arising of all dharmas. Originally it exists and it is present now, irrespective of cultivation of the Way and sitting in meditation. Not cultivating and not sitting is the Tathāgata's pure meditation. Some scholars, like Yanagida Seizan think that this passage shows Mazu rejected formal sitting meditation. However, according to Poceski, "the passage simply asserts that the originally existing Buddha-nature does not depend on the practice of meditation or any other spiritual exercise—in itself, little more than a sound doctrinal statement. Mazu's position is echoed in canonical texts, most notably the Vimalakīrti." As such, Poceski argues that this passage is best read "as a warning against misguided contemplative practice and advice about the proper approach to spiritual cultivation." 

Poceski writes that "this interpretation is reinforced by Guishan jingce, which indicates that the monks at Guishan's monastery (and presumably monks at other monasteries associated with the Hongzhou school) engaged in a regimen of traditional monastic practices, of which meditation was an integral part." Furthermore, Dayi's Zuochang ming (Inscription on Sitting Meditation) "resents the practice in fairly conventional terms." Therefore, the lack of attention to meditation in Hongzhou sources is likely to be because their meditation methods were "not that different from those of other contemplative traditions, such as early Chan and Tiantai," though this does not mean they did not interpret them in a unique way according to their other teachings."   
One well-known story depicts Mazu practicing sitting meditation (dhyana, chan), but being chided by his teacher Nanyue Huairang, comparing seated meditation with polishing a tile to make a mirror. According to Faure, this story is critiquing "the idea of "becoming a Buddha" by means of any practice, lowered to the standing of a "means" to achieve an "end"."

Texts
Some of the main Tang dynasty sources which contain the teachings of the Hongzhou masters have been translated into English, and include the following:

 Cheng-chien Bhikshu [Mario Poceski] (1992). Sun-Face Buddha: The Teachings of Ma-tsu and the Hung-chou School of Ch'an;
 Cleary, Thomas (1978). Sayings and Doings of Pai-chang; 
 Blofeld, John (1987). The Zen Teaching of Instantaneous Awakening: Being the Teaching of the Zen Master Hui Hai, Known as the Great Pearl
 Blofeld, John (1994). The Zen Teaching of Huang-po on the Transmission of Mind.

Song dynasty sources 
According to Mario Poceski, traditional accounts that rely on Song dynasty sources like the Jingde chuandeng lu (Jingde [Era] Record of the Transmission of the Lamp; c. 1004) depict the Hongzhou school as a revolutionary and iconoclastic group that rejected tradition and embraced antinomian practices. In Song texts "we find portrayals of Mazu and his disciples as iconoclasts par excellence, who transgress established norms and subvert received traditions. A well-known example of such radical representations is the story about Mazu's disciple Nanquan (748–834) killing a cat." 

Some of these apocryphal “encounter dialogue” (ch: jiyuan wenda, jp: kien mondō) stories depict the Hongzhou school making use of "shock techniques such as shouting, beating, and using irrational retorts to startle their students into realization". Earlier scholars like D. T. Suzuki and Hu Shih relied on these sources and saw the Hongzhou school as a radical departure from traditional Buddhism. 

During the Song dynasty, the "yü-lü" ("record") genre also developed, the recorded sayings of the masters, and the encounter dialogues. The best-known example is the Lin-ji yü-lü. It is part of the Ssu-chia yü lu (Jp. Shike Goruku, The Collection of the Four Houses), which contains the recorded sayings of Mazu Daoyi, Baizhang Huaihai, Huangbo Xiyun and Linji Yixuan. These recorded sayings are well-edited texts, written down up to 160 years after the supposed sayings and meetings. 

However, Mario Poceski writes: an unreflective reliance on the Song texts—especially the iconoclastic stories contained in them—is problematic because we cannot trace any of the encounter dialogues back to the Tang period. No source from the Tang period indicates that there was even an awareness of the existence of the encounter‐dialogue format, let alone that it was the main medium of instruction employed in Chan circles. The radicalized images of Mazu, Nanquan, and other Chan teachers from the mid‐Tang period make their first appearance in the middle of the tenth century, well over a century after their deaths. The earliest text that contains such anecdotes is Zutang ji (compiled in 952), and the iconoclastic stories became normative only during the Song period. Accordingly, we can best understand such records as apocryphal or legendary narratives. They were a focal element of imaginative Chan lore created in response to specific social and religious circumstances and served as a centerpiece of an emerging Chan ideology. By means of these stories, novel religious formulations and nascent orthodoxies were retroactively imputed back to the great Chan teachers of the Tang period. The connection with the glories of the bygone Tang era bestowed a sense of sanctity and was a potent tool for legitimizing the Chan school in the religious world of Song China.

Influence
Mazu is perhaps the most influential teaching master in the formation of Chán Buddhism in China. When Chán became the dominant school of Buddhism during the Song dynasty, the Tang period of Mazu's school became regarded as the "Golden Age" of Chan. Numerous stories and texts were written celebrating these figures, many of them apocryphal. 

The "shock techniques" found in many of these apocryphal stories became part of the traditional and still popular image of Chan masters displaying irrational and strange behaviour to help their students achieve enlightenment. Part of this image was due to later misinterpretations and translation errors, such as the loud belly shout known as katsu. In Chinese "katsu" means "to shout", which has traditionally been translated as "yelled 'katsu'" - which should mean "yelled a yell"

The stories about the Hongzhou school are part of the Traditional Zen Narrative which rose to prominence in the Song dynasty, when Chán was the dominant form of Buddhism and received the support of the Imperial Court and the elite literati.

According to modern scholars like McRae, this idea of a "golden age" of iconoclastic and radical Chan masters was mainly a romantic invention of later Song Buddhists:

Criticism
The Hung-chou school has been criticised for its radical subitism.

Guifeng Zongmi (圭峰 宗密) (780–841), an influential teacher-scholar and patriarch of both the Chán and the Huayan school claimed that the Hung-chou tradition believed "everything as altogether true". Zongmi writes:Hongzhou school teaches that the arising of mental activity, the movement of thought, snapping the fingers, or moving the eyes, all actions and activities are the functioning of the entire essence of the Buddha-nature. Since there is no other kind of functioning, greed, anger, and folly, the performance of good and bad actions, and the experiencing of their pleasurable and painful consequences are all, in their entirety, Buddha-nature.According to Zongmi, the Hongzhou school teaching led to a radical non-dualistic view that believed that all actions, good or bad, are expressing Buddha-nature, and therefore denies the need for spiritual cultivation and moral discipline (sila). Zongmi's interpretation of the Hongzhou doctrine would be a dangerously antinomian view, as it eliminates all moral distinctions and validates any actions (including unethical ones) as expressions of the essence of Buddha-nature.

While Zongmi acknowledged that the essence of Buddha-nature and its functioning in the day-to-day reality are but difference aspects of the same reality, he insisted that there is a difference. To avoid the dualism he saw in the Northern Line and the radical nondualism and antinomianism of the Hongzhou school, Zongmi’s paradigm preserved "an ethically critical duality within a larger ontological unity", an ontology which he claimed was lacking in Hongzhou Chan.

See also
 Zen
 Chinese Chán

References

Book references

Web references

Sources

Further reading

External links
 thezensite: history of Zen

Chan schools